Marcel Sgualdo (born December 18, 1944) is a retired Swiss professional ice hockey player who played for HC La Chaux-de-Fonds in the National League A.  He also represented the Swiss national team at the 1972 Winter Olympics.

References

External links
Marcel Sgualdo's stats at Sports-Reference.com

1944 births
Living people
Ice hockey players at the 1972 Winter Olympics
Olympic ice hockey players of Switzerland
Swiss ice hockey defencemen
HC La Chaux-de-Fonds players
Lausanne HC players